The SL Hitoyoshi (SL 人吉) is a named steam hauled excursion train operated by the Kyushu Railway Company (JR Kyushu) on the Kagoshima Main Line and the Hisatsu Line since April 2009.

Overview
The SL Hitoyoshi runs a return journey between Kumamoto and Hitoyoshi once a day on weekends and national holidays from March to November. The train was inaugurated to celebrate the 100th anniversary of the completion of the Hisatsu Line. A reserved seat must be made prior to boarding. The train stops at Shin-Yatsushiro, Yatsushiro, Sakamoto, Shiroishi, Isshōchi, and Watari.

Since the damage of the 2020 Kyushu floods to the Hisatsu Line, the SL Hitoyoshi now temporarily runs between Kumamoto and Tosu Station.

Rolling stock
The SL Hitoyoshi consists of an 8620 (8620形) Class steam locomotive and three specially modified OHa 50 series (オハ50系) carriages. The interior design of the carriages was done by industrial designer Eiji Mitooka.
On occasion the train is assisted or hauled by a Class DE10 (DE10形) diesel locomotive.

Exterior

The train livery is painted chocolate with grey roofs and SL Hitoyoshi motifs and lettering in gold.

In 2020, JR Kyushu repainted the SL Hitoyoshi black to replicate the Mugen Train from the anime film Demon Slayer: Kimetsu no Yaiba the Movie: Mugen Train for a limited run from Kumamoto Station to Hakata Station from 1 to 26 November.

See also
List of named passenger trains of Japan
Joyful Train, the generic name for excursion and charter trains in Japan.
History of rail transport in Japan
Japan Railways locomotive numbering and classification

References

External links 

The Japanese Railway Society: Steam in Japan
Classification System of JR Group Locomotives and Rolling Stock
Steam Train Hitoyoshi - YouTube

Kyushu Railway Company
Named passenger trains of Japan
Railway services introduced in 2009